Jakob Wilhelm Roux (13 April 1771, Jena - 22 August 1830, Heidelberg) was a German painter and draughtsman.

Roux was born to a Huguenot family. He studied mathematics for a time at the University of Jena. He later enrolled in the university of Christian Immanuel Oehme where his interests and classes turned to the arts. It was while studying there that he met the surgeon Justus Christian Loder, with whom he collaborated. Roux did a number of anatomical illustrations for Loder. Roux later primarily painted portraits.

He was first married in 1801 to Pauline Johanna Heyligenstädt, and they had two daughters and a son together. Two years after she died in 1823, Roux remarried to Charlotte Mariana Wippermann. They had two sons together. He died in Heidelberg in 1830.

References

External links
 
Karl Roux: Roux, Jacob. In: Allgemeine Deutsche Biographie (ADB). Band 29. Duncker & Humblot, Leipzig 1889, S. 409 f.

1771 births
1830 deaths
18th-century German painters
18th-century German male artists
German male painters
19th-century German painters
19th-century German male artists
German draughtsmen